Dudu is a 2003 extended play album by Tarkan. This was his first album to be released through his own record label, HITT Music. It holds five songs and five remixes. The album was published in Europe and Asia. The sales of the album exceeded 4.1 million copies worldwide, of which over 2.5 million were sold in Turkey alone. To support the album, beginning in November 2003 Tarkan gave solo performances in Turkey and other countries. In 2004 as part of Dudu World tour Tarkan visited Austria, Germany, France, United States, Ukraine, Russia, Finland, the Netherlands, Azerbaijan and Kazakhstan.

Track listing 

Uzun İnce Bir Yoldayım (Remix)

Album credits
 Personnel Crew:
 Production: Hitt Music
 Produced by: Tarkan
 Distributor: Istanbul Plak Ltd.
 Producer: Tarkan & Ozan Çolakoğlu
 Mix: Murat Matthew Erdem
 Mastering: Tim Young, Metropolist Studios London
 Recorded at: Sari Ev (Kayit ve Mix), Imaj, ASM (Uzun Ince Bir Yoldayim Mix)
 Executive Producer: Egemen Öncel
 Photos: Hasan Hüseyin
 Hair Design: Mete Türkmen
 Make-up Artist: Neriman Eröz
 Costume Coordinator: Gülümser Gürtunca

Guest musicians
 Instruments:
 Classical Guitar - Erdem Sökmen, Ayhan Gunyil
 Electric, Bass (Guitar) - Nurkan Renda
 Oud - Ilyas Tetik
 Strings - Gündem Yayli Grubu (String Band)
 String Arrangements (Track 2) - Hamit Undas
 For Track 5:
 Background vocals, Baglama (Lead, Bass) - Arif Sağ
 Baglama (Arpeggio), Selpe - Erdal Erzincan
 Balaban - Ertan Tekin
 Percussion - Mehmet Akatay, Cengiz Ercumer, Arif Sağ

Music videos

 Dudu
 Gülümse Kaderine
 Sorma Kalbim
 Uzun İnce Bir Yoldayım (Ozinga Mix) (The music video was filmed to a remixed version that does not appear on the album.)

Extra information

Tarkan's 2003 musical offering was his first album to be released under his own label HITT Music and the first Tarkan album to be packaged in a Digipak. Technically it could be classed as an EP release with only five edits and five remixes, but it is generally viewed as an album as its track length is over 35 minutes. Dudu was the first hybrid album of its kind in Turkey to sell over 1,000,000 copies. Tarkan once again collaborated with singer-songwriter Nazan Öncel for this album after a successful collaboration on his Karma album. - courtesy of Ali Yildirim

"Uzun İnce Bir Yoldayım (remix)" - '5:47'

Notes

External links
 Dudu Official Album Website in Turkish and English
 Album and Song Lyrics Information in English
 Ozgur Buldum

Tarkan (singer) albums
2003 albums
Albums produced by Ozan Çolakoğlu